Akbar Ayub Khan (Urdu: اکبر ایوب خان) is a Pakistani politician who had served as Minister Local Government, Elections & Rural Development, in office from 18 September 2020 to 5 August 2021. He was a member of the Provincial assembly of Khyber Pakhtunkhwa from February 2014 to May 2018 and from August 2018 to January 2023. He is also the grandson of the former President of Pakistan, Field Marshal Ayub Khan.

Early life 
Akbar Ayub was born in village Rehana in Haripur District of Khyber Pakhtunkhwa, Pakistan. He attended Army Burn Hall College where he completed his metric after which he became a successful businessman till he ran for the 2013 elections from the constituency PK-40.

Political career 
Akbar Ayub contested the by-elections 2014 from the constituency PK-50 Haripur-II as a member of Pakistan Tehreek e Insaf. He defeated both his opponent of PMLN and an independent candidate and held the seat. Akbar became the advisor of the Communication and work department. He served till 2018.
He again ran for the seat in 2018 Pakistan general elections from the PTI party. He ran from the constituency PK-40 Haripur-I and once again gave defeat to his competitive. After taking an oath, he was appointed again as minister of Communication and work department. On 3 January 2020, a changing occurred in the KP department. He was appointed as a Minister of Education. After many successful months working as Education minister he became Minister Local government, Elections and Rural development in September 2020. He also held for additional charge, after horse trading in Kp cabinet, and held for Law, parliamentary affairs, and human rights ministry in February 2021, which was previously held by Sultan Muhammad Khan. In May 2021, he was given additional charge for parliamentary affairs and human rights, whereas law portfolio too Fazal shakoor khan.

References

1971 births
Living people
People from Haripur District
Pakistani businesspeople
Akbar
Pakistan Tehreek-e-Insaf MPAs (Khyber Pakhtunkhwa)
Army Burn Hall College alumni